Morgan Moore Moulder (August 31, 1904 – November 12, 1976) was a U.S. Representative from Missouri.

Background
Born in Linn Creek, Missouri, Moulder attended the public schools of Linn Creek and Lebanon, Missouri, and the University of Missouri.
He was graduated from Cumberland University, Lebanon, Tennessee, LL.B., 1927.

Career

Moulder was admitted to the bar in 1928 and commenced the practice of law in Linn Creek, Missouri.

Moulder was elected prosecuting attorney of Camden County, Missouri, in 1928.  He was reelected for three succeeding terms and served until 1938.

In 1938, he returned to the private practice of law.

From 1943 to 1946, he served as special assistant to the United States attorney for the western district of Missouri.

In April 1947, he was appointed by the Governor to serve as a judge of the circuit court in the eighteenth judicial circuit and served until December 31, 1948.

In 1949, Moulder was elected as a Democrat to the Eighty-first and to the six succeeding sessions of the U.S. Congress (January 3, 1949 – January 3, 1963).  He served on the House Un-American Activities Committee (HUAC). While HUAC member in 1950, he heard testimony from Lee Pressman and Max Lowenthal among others.

Moulder did not sign the 1956 Southern Manifesto, and voted in favor of the Civil Rights Acts of 1957 and 1960, as well as the 24th Amendment to the U.S. Constitution.

He was not a candidate for reelection in 1962 to the Eighty-eighth Congress.

He resumed the practice of law in Camdenton, Missouri.

Personal life and death

Moulder died November 12, 1976. He was interred in Old Linn Creek Cemetery, near Camdenton.

References

1904 births
1976 deaths
20th-century American judges
20th-century American politicians
American prosecutors
Cumberland University alumni
Democratic Party members of the United States House of Representatives from Missouri
Missouri state court judges
People from Camden County, Missouri
University of Missouri alumni